Gail Rizzo (born 2 February 1979) is a Maltese former swimmer and current swimming coach who represented Malta at the 1996 Summer Olympic Games.

Career 

At the 1996 Summer Olympic Games Rizzo finished 50th out of 55 competitors in the women's 50m freestyle in a time of 28.43 seconds, 48th and last in the women's 100m freestyle with a time of 1:02.19 and 33rd out of 36 in the women's 100m backstroke with a time of 1:07.61.

Rizzo set a national record of 2:25.66 in the 200m backstroke in May 1997. The record lasted until 2019.

She later became head coach of Neptunes WPSC.

References

External links
 

1979 births
Living people
Olympic swimmers of Malta
Swimmers at the 1996 Summer Olympics
Swimming coaches
Maltese female swimmers